Ochromolopis sagittella is a moth in the family Epermeniidae. It was described by Reinhard Gaedike in 2013. It is found in Kenya.

References

Moths described in 2013
Epermeniidae
Moths of Africa
Lepidoptera of Kenya